Protoflight is a portmanteau of "prototype" and "flight hardware". As defined by NASA Technical Standard NASA-STD-7002A, it refers to a strategy where no test-dedicated qualification article exists and all production (flight) hardware is intended for flight. An example of a program using protoflight methods is the Mars Orbiter Laser Altimeter project.

A protoflight approach carries a higher technical risk approach compared to a full qualification test program since it has no demonstrated life capability over the anticipated life cycle of the hardware, but is a technology development design process that utilizes higher risk tolerances, agile management practices, and quick responsiveness that are needed for certain prototype flight projects or missions.

Examples
 Atmospheric Reentry Demonstrator

References

Aerospace